Libya first participated at the Olympic Games in 1964, and has sent athletes to compete in most Summer Olympic Games since then.  The nation boycotted the 1976 Games along with most other African nations, and also boycotted the 1984 Games.  Libya has never participated in the Winter Olympic Games.

To date, no Libyan athlete has ever won an Olympic medal.

The National Olympic Committee for Libya was created in 1962 and recognized by the International Olympic Committee in 1963.

Medal tables

Medals by Summer Games

See also 
 List of flag bearers for Libya at the Olympics
 Libya at the Paralympics

External links